The Wayne County Public School System is the 20th largest in the state of North Carolina out of 115 school systems.

Public schools

High schools
Charles B. Aycock High School, Pikeville
Eastern Wayne High School, Goldsboro
Goldsboro High School, Goldsboro
Rosewood High School, Goldsboro
Southern Wayne High School, Dudley
Spring Creek High School, Seven Springs
Wayne Early/Middle College High School, Goldsboro
Wayne Middle/High Academy, Goldsboro
Wayne School of Engineering (6–12), Goldsboro

Middle schools
Brogden Middle (5–8)
Dillard Middle School (5–8)
Eastern Wayne Middle (6–8)
Mount Olive Middle (5–8)
Norwayne Middle (6–8)
Rosewood Middle (6–8)
Greenwood middle (5–8)
Wayne School of Engineering (6–12)

Elementary schools
Brogden Primary (K–4)
Carver Elementary (K–4)
Carver Heights Elementary (K–4)
Fremont STARS (K–5)
Eastern Wayne Elementary (K–5)
Grantham School (K–8)
Meadow Lane Elementary (K–4)
North Drive Elementary (K–4)
Northeast Elementary (K–5)
Northwest Elementary (K–5)
Rosewood Elementary (K–5)
School Street Elementary (K–4)
Spring Creek Elementary (K–4)
Tommy's Road Elementary (K–5)

Other Schools
Belfast Academy
Edgewood Community Developmental School
Southern Academy

Official website
Wayne County Public Schools

School districts in North Carolina
Education in Wayne County, North Carolina